UFC Fight Night 225 (also known as UFC on ESPN+ 83) is an upcoming mixed martial arts event produced by the Ultimate Fighting Championship that will take place on May 20, 2023, at a TBD venue and location.

Announced bouts 
Middleweight bout: Edmen Shahbazyan vs. Anthony Hernandez
Heavyweight bout: Ilir Latifi vs. Rodrigo Nascimento
Women's Strawweight bout: Karolina Kowalkiewicz vs. Vanessa Demopoulos
Middleweight bout: Abdul Razak Alhassan vs. Brunno Ferreira
Lightweight bout: Hayisaer Maheshate vs. Viacheslav Borschev

See also 

 List of UFC events
 List of current UFC fighters
 2023 in UFC

References 

 

UFC Fight Night
2023 in mixed martial arts
Scheduled mixed martial arts events